Polystichum setiferum, the soft shield fern, is an evergreen or semi-evergreen fern native to southern and western Europe. The stalks and most midribs are coated with attractive cinnamon-brown scales. The Latin specific epithet setiferum means “with bristles”.

Distribution 
It is most abundant in Ireland, southwestern Great Britain, western France and northwest Iberia, where it benefits from the combination of mild winters and moist summers, but also occurs more locally north to northern Scotland and east to the Crimea and Turkey; in the Mediterranean it usually grows at high altitudes. It grows in woodlands, often but not always on steep slopes.

Description 

The fronds are soft-textured, bipinnate (single-pinnate on small, young plants), with the pinnae opposite on the stalk. Individual fronds remain lush and fresh-looking throughout the season. They live for nine to fifteen months and remain attached to the rhizome after withering. The round sori occupy two rows on either side of the midrib of each pinnule and are covered by a centrally-attached, umbrella-like indusium with fringed edges. They produce light yellow spores.

Cultivation 
Polystichum setiferum is frequently cultivated as an ornamental plant for use in gardens. There are many cultivars available: over 300 have been described although most are no longer in cultivation or not considered sufficiently distinct for an individual name. The following cultivars have gained the Royal Horticultural Society’s Award of Garden Merit: 
Divisilobum Group 
’Divisilobum Densum’
 ‘Divisilobum Iveryanum’

References

Further reading 

 Flora Europaea: Polystichum setiferum
 Hyde, H. A., Wade, A. E., & Harrison, S. G. (1978). Welsh Ferns. National Museum of Wales.
 Rickard, Martin (2000). The Plantfinder's Guide to Garden Ferns. David & Charles
 Dyce, J. W. (2005). Polystichum Cultivars: Variation in the British Shield Ferns. British Pteridological Society

setiferum
Flora of Southwestern Europe
Flora of the Azores
Flora of Great Britain
Flora of Ireland
Garden plants of Europe